Caroline Verbraecken-De Loose (26 November 1924 – 7 October 2001) was a Belgian gymnast. She competed in the women's artistic team all-around at the 1948 Summer Olympics.

References

1924 births
2001 deaths
Belgian female artistic gymnasts
Olympic gymnasts of Belgium
Gymnasts at the 1948 Summer Olympics
Sportspeople from Antwerp